745 Mauritia (prov. designation:  or ) is a dark background asteroid from the outer regions of the asteroid belt, approximately  in diameter. It was discovered on 1 March 1913, by German astronomer Franz Kaiser at the Heidelberg-Königstuhl State Observatory in Germany. The presumed carbonaceous C-type asteroid has a rotation period of 9.9 hours. It was named after Saint Maurice, patron of the Saint Mauritius church in the city of Wiesbaden, where the discoverer was born.

Orbit and classification 

Mauritia is a non-family asteroid of the main belt's background population when applying the hierarchical clustering method to its proper orbital elements. It orbits the Sun in the outer asteroid belt at a distance of 3.1–3.4 AU once every 5 years and 11 months (2,154 days; semi-major axis of 3.26 AU). Its orbit has an eccentricity of 0.04 and an inclination of 13° with respect to the ecliptic. The body's observation arc begins at Heidelberg on 3 January 1918, almost five years after its official discovery observation.

Naming 

This minor planet was named after 3rd-century Christian martyr Saint Maurice, who is the patron of the  church in Wiesbaden, Germany, where the discoverer was born (also see 717 Wisibada). The Swiss village Saint-Maurice, where he died in AD 287 is also named after Saint Maurice. The  was mentioned in The Names of the Minor Planets by Paul Herget in 1955.

Physical characteristics 

Mauritia is an assumed, carbonaceous C-type asteroid due to its low albedo (see below) and its location in the outer asteroid belt. However, D-type and P-type asteroids fulfill the location and albedo-based criterions as well.

Rotation period 

In March 2013, a first rotational lightcurve of Mauritia was obtained from photometric observations over six nights by Frederick Pilcher at the Organ Mesa Observatory  in New Mexico, United States. Lightcurve analysis gave a well-defined rotation period of  hours with a brightness variation of  magnitude.

Diameter and albedo 

The Collaborative Asteroid Lightcurve Link assumes a standard albedo for a carbonaceous asteroid of 0.057 and calculates a diameter of 44.22 kilometers based on an absolute magnitude of 10.5.

Notes

References

External links 
 Lightcurve Database Query (LCDB), at www.minorplanet.info
 Dictionary of Minor Planet Names, Google books
 Asteroids and comets rotation curves, CdR – Geneva Observatory, Raoul Behrend
 Discovery Circumstances: Numbered Minor Planets (1)-(5000) – Minor Planet Center
 
 

000745
Discoveries by Franz Kaiser
Named minor planets
19130301